APMIS Journal, formerly known as Acta Pathologica, Microbiologica, et Immunologica Scandinavica, is a monthly peer-reviewed medical journal published by Wiley on behalf of the Scandinavian Societies for Medical Microbiology and Pathology . Its covers research in the fields of pathology, microbiology, and immunology, and related areas of biomedicine".

History 
The journal was formed in 1988 by a merger of the three sections of Acta Pathologica, Microbiologica, et Immunologica Scandinavica: Section A, Pathology, Section B, Microbiology, and Section C, Immunology. The original journals dated from 1924, originally published as Acta Pathologica et Microbiologica Scandinavica. Since 2012 it has been an electronic-only publication.

References

External links

Pathology journals
Publications established in 1924
Wiley (publisher) academic journals
Monthly journals
English-language journals